The Kheshgi, Khaishgi, Kheshagi, Khweshgi, or Kheshki, Khaishagi is a prominent Sarbani Pashtun tribe and Imperial dynasty in South Asia.

Administration
The Kheshgi Tribe is divided into the following sub-tribes:

 Batakzi
 Umerzai
 Hussainzai
 Azizi
 Zaizai
 Utmanzai
 Amchuzi/Amchuzai
 Shuryani
 Salmahak
 Kalzani
 Ismail
Pir

Location 
Even in the 19th-century during the British administration of India, Kheshgi tribesmen were found in Kasur District scattered about the region and they call Kasuri Pathan.  A more recent article also states that over the past few hundred years they have dispersed throughout South Asia, including the following places:
Afghanistan: Darrah Ghorband, Ghorband District, Parwan Province.
Khyber Pakhtunkhwa: Dera Ismail Khan, Bannu, Lakki Marwat, Tanda, Muhallah Kheshgi in Ghanta Ghar (Peshawar), Charsadda, Village Kheshgi itself in Nowshera and Hazarah.
Punjab Province: Kasur, Depalpur, BahawalPur, Bahawalnagar, Multan.
India: Khurja, Uttar Pradesh.

Culture and Society
Several British accounts state that the Kheshgi residing in Kasur hold pigeons in high esteem, for according to some Muslims they are a "Sayyid among birds", and killing them is hence forbidden.<ref>Crooke, William. The Popular Religion and Folk-lore of Northern India, Vol. II. Westminster: Archibald Constable & Co., 1896. 246.</ref>

 Notable Kheshgis 

 Fayaz Khan Kheshgi, Pakistani musician
 Zakir Husain, third President of India
 Nawab Hussain Khan Kheshgi, founder of Kasur
 Mahmood Hasan Khan, Indian Member of Parliament 
 Ahmad Raza Khan Kasuri, lawyer, politician, founder of multinational law firm Kasuri PLLC''
 Haji Bahadar Ali Abdullah Shah, Sufi saint
 General Rahmuddin Khan, retired four-star general of the Pakistan Army, former Chairman Joint Chiefs of Staff Committee, 7th Governor of Balochistan, 16th Governor of Sindh 
 Nawab Muzaffar Khan Khaishgi, founder of Muzaffargarh, Governor of Multan
 General Imran Ullah Khan, retired three-star general of the Pakistan Army, 13th Governor of Balochistan
 Nawab Jamaluddin Khan Kheshgi, founder of Mamdot
 Khurshid Mahmud Kasuri, former Pakistani Foreign Minister
 Farida Azizi, Afghan women's rights activist
 Nawab Muhammad Ahmed Khan Kasuri, former Nawab of Kasur
 Senain Kheshgi, film director, writer and producer
 Moeenuddin Ahmad Qureshi, former Prime Minister of Pakistan
 Mohammad Iqbal Azizi, Afghan governor
 Nawab Sir Shahnawaz Khan Mamdot, politician, Punjabi landlord
 Asma Mamdot, Pakistani politician 
 Mahmud Husain, Pakistani educationist, former Minister of Education, Minister of State for States and Frontier Regions, Deputy Minister of Defense, Foreign Affairs and Finance
 Masud Husain Khan, Indian linguist
 Salman Khurshid Khan, Indian politician
 Muhammad Bashir Khan, Pakistani politician
 Shakeel Bashir Khan, Pakistani politician
 Major General Akbar Khan, highly decorated officer of the British Indian Army, two-star general of the Pakistan Army
 Yousuf Hussain Khan, Indian historian, scholar, educationist, critic and author
 Masoud Azizi, Afghan athlete
 Nawab Iftikhar Hussain Khan Mamdot, former Chief Minister of West Punjab and former Governor of Sindh

References

Sarbani Pashtun tribes
Ethnic groups in Afghanistan
Social groups of Pakistan